The United States Post Office issued the Statue of Liberty Forever stamp on December 1, 2010. The stamp shows the replica of the Statue of Liberty (Liberty Enlightening the World) located at the New York-New York Hotel and Casino on the Las Vegas Strip rather than the original Statue of Liberty in New York. The error was not noticed until March 2011. The error was identified by Sunipix, a stock photo agency in Texas. Ten and a half billion of the error stamps were produced. The mistake is the largest run of an error on a postage stamp.

In 2013, sculptor Robert S. Davidson sued the Postal Service for copyright infringement and in July 2018, a judge ordered the United States Postal Service to pay Davidson $3.5 million.

References 

Postage stamps of the United States
Statue of Liberty